George Somers was an English naval hero.

George Somers may also refer to:

George Somers (American football) (1915–1964), American football offensive lineman and placekicker
George Somers, candidate for Miramichi

See also
George Summers (disambiguation)
George Somers Clarke (disambiguation)
George Sommer, Peruvian footballer